Pociūnai is a village in the eldership or elderate of Ašmintos, in the Prienai district municipality in Kaunas County, Lithuania. According to the 2011 census, the village had 53 residents.

References

Villages in Kaunas County